The 2016–17 Southeastern Conference men's basketball season began with practices in October 2016, followed by the start of the 2016–17 NCAA Division I men's basketball season in November. Conference play started in early January 2017 and concluded in March, after which 14 member teams participated in the 2017 SEC tournament at Bridgestone Arena in Nashville, Tennessee, with the tournament champion guaranteed a selection to the 2017 NCAA tournament.

Preseason

Media Day Selections

() first place votes

Preseason  All-SEC teams

Coaches select 8 players
Players in bold are choices for SEC Player of the Year

Head coaches

Note: Stats shown are before the beginning of the season. Overall and SEC records are from time at current school.

Rankings

SEC regular season
This table summarizes the head-to-head results between teams in conference play.

Postseason

SEC Tournament

 March, 12 at the Bridgestone Arena, Nashville, Tennessee. Teams will be seeded by conference record, with ties broken by record between the tied teams followed by record against the regular-season champion, if necessary.

NCAA tournament

National Invitation Tournament

College Basketball Invitational

Honors and awards

Players of the Week
Throughout the conference regular season, the SEC offices named one or two players of the week and one or two freshmen of the week each Monday.

All-SEC Awards

Coaches

AP

SEC Tournament Awards

All-Americans

NBA draft

References

External links
SEC website